Saddle Ranch Chop House is an American restaurant founded in September 1999 as a Western-themed restaurant.

History
The first location was on the Sunset Strip in West Hollywood, California. The restaurant became famous for bringing a Western feel to the trendy, upscale location. 

Each restaurant features a mechanical bull that patrons can attempt to ride.

The restaurant has appeared many times in popular culture, showing up on TV shows such as Sex and the City, The Bachelor, Desperate Housewives, The Girls Next Door, Bad Girls Club, Charm School with Ricki Lake, Burning Love and Rock of Love.

In 2013, Business Insider named it the rowdiest bar in the United States.

Locations
There are two locations:
West Hollywood, California
Orange, California

Reality show
In 2011 VH1 began airing a reality show that follows the lives of the staff from both Los Angeles locations. Saddle Ranch premiered on April 17 as part of VH1's new Sunday night prime time line up. Saddle Ranch takes us on a "sex & rock 'n roll mechanical bull ride" into the lives, loves, and "fake it 'til you make it" dreams of the guys and girls who work at this iconic restaurant - from the hosts at the bottom of the totem pole, to the beautiful bartenders and wait staff, to the demanding managers (who watch their every serve and pour). The reality show follows 11 of the bar's employees.

References

External links
 Official Saddle Ranch Chop House website

Restaurants in Greater Los Angeles
Buildings and structures in West Hollywood, California
Restaurants established in 1999
1999 establishments in California
Western-themed restaurants